Blosozumab binds SOST, a negative regulator of osteoblast activity.  Blocking SOST activity can lead to increased bone density. Blosozaumab has been studied with regards to the treatment of osteoporosis in both men and postmenopausal women. Clinical trials with Blosozumab have shown the antibody to be well tolerated and effective in producing a bone anabolic effect.

Blosozumab was developed by Eli Lilly and Company.

References 

Eli Lilly and Company brands